Henrietta Consuelo Sansom, Countess of Quigini Puliga (24 April 1847 – 5 August 1938) was a French writer and novelist known better by the pseudonym, Brada, a shortened version of her earlier pen name, Bradamente. She also wrote on occasion as Mosca. In 1925, she was appointed Chevalier of the Legion of Honour. The Académie Française  awarded her the Montyon Prize in 1890, the Jouy Prize in 1895, and the Xavier Marmier Prize in 1934.

Early life and education
Henrietta (also known as, "Marie") Consuelo Sansom was born 24 April 1847, in Paris. She was the daughter of a wealthy British expatriate, Charles Sansom. Brada spent most of her childhood boarding in a girls' private school located near the Arc de Triomphe. Being born out of wedlock, she found herself destitute upon the death of her father, whose inheritance was shared by his legitimate children.

Career
In 1868, she married an Italian count twenty years her senior, Efisio Quigini Puliga (1827-1876), adviser to the Italian Legation in Paris, who died in 1876 following a long illness. To provide for the education of her two young children, she began to write chronicles and short stories under the pseudonym "Bradamente", later abbreviated to "Brada", which were published in the Journal des débats, Le Figaro, the Revue de Paris as well as in several other periodicals such as La Vie parisienne and L'Illustration where she used the pseudonym, "Mosca". Her novels and short stories, which soon appeared in bookstores, met with great success and received awards from the Académie Française with the Montyon Prize in 1890, the Jouy Prize in 1895, and the Xavier Marmier Prize in 1934. She thus continued to write until at the age of over 80, leading a simple life in Paris interspersed with stays in Italy.

The success of her novels was due in part to the aristocratic circles that she had participated in, first while in Paris and London, where she had lived with her father, then in Berlin, where she had followed her husband in his diplomatic career. They were largely based on "cosmopolitan high-society intrigues" depicting "supremely aristocratic passions and vices". Often compared to Gyp, Brada was appreciated by her contemporary readers for her "spontaneity and freshness" as well as for her "elegance and distinction".

She dabbled in different genres. Her first book, Madame de Sévigné: Her Correspondents and Contemporaries, written in English and published in London in 1873, was a study of the correspondents and contemporaries of Madame de Sévigné. Brada's remarks on the decline of the aristocracy and the emancipation of women, which appeared in her Notes sur Londres (Notes on London) in 1895, caught the attention of Henry James.

In later life, she published two memories, one in English, the other in French. In the first, published in 1899 under the title My Father and I, she evoked her early childhood as well as her first steps in British high society in the company of her father, to whom she felt bound by a great complicity. In the second, entitled Souvenirs d'une petite Second Empire and published in 1921, she recounted her memories of boarding school and, among many other anecdotes, the visits she made to Ewelina Hańska, Balzac's widow.

Death

She died 5 August 1938, Paris, and was buried in the Père Lachaise Cemetery (section 46).

Awards
 1890, Montyon Prize (Madame d’Épone)
 1895, Jouy Prize (Notes sur l’Angleterre)
 23 July 1925, Chevalier, Legion of Honour
 1934, Xavier Marmier Prize

Selected works

Chronicles, novels, short stories

Leurs Excellences, 1878
Mylord et mylady, 1884
Compromise, 1889
"lzac", Paris, S. Kra, 1924, p. 61., L'Irrémédiable, 1891
À la dérive, 1893
Notes sur Londres, 1895
Jeunes Madames, preface by Anatole France, 1895
Joug d'amour, 1895
Les Épouseurs, 1896
Lettres d'une amoureuse, 1897
L'Ombre, 1898
Petits et grands, 1898
Une impasse, 1899
Comme les autres, 1902
Retour du flot, (Collection Nelson) 1903
Isolée, 1904
Les Beaux jours de Flavien, 1905
Ninette et sa grand'mère, 1906
Disparu, 1906
Les Amantes, 1907
Malgré l'amour, 1907
L'Àme libre, 1908
La Brèche, 1909
Monsieur Carotte. La Petite bergère. Le Bal des pantins, 1910
Madame d'Épone, 1922
Après la tourmente, 1926
Cœur solitaire, 1928
La Maison de la peur, 1930
Prise au piège, 1937

Scripts
Le Coup de feu, Pathé frères, 1911
Le Geste qui accuse, Pathé frères, 1913

Biographies
Madame de Sévigné, her correspondents and contemporaries, 2 vol., 1873 (in English)

Memoirs
My Father and I. A book for daughters, 1899 (in English)
Souvenirs d'une petite Second Empire, 1921

Notes

References

1847 births
1938 deaths
19th-century French writers
19th-century French non-fiction writers
19th-century French short story writers
19th-century French novelists
20th-century French memoirists
19th-century French women writers
20th-century French women writers
19th-century pseudonymous writers
20th-century pseudonymous writers
Writers from Paris
Pseudonymous women writers
French biographers
French women novelists
French women short story writers
20th-century French dramatists and playwrights
French women dramatists and playwrights
Women biographers
Chevaliers of the Légion d'honneur
English-language writers from France